Feminism in Ireland has played a major role in shaping the legal and social position of women in present-day Ireland. The role of women has been influenced by numerous legal changes in the second part of the 20th century, especially in the 1970s.

History

1870-1910s:before independence

The women's movement in what was to become the Republic of Ireland started in the second half of the 19th-century. The pioneer of the women's movement on Ireland was Anna Haslam, who in 1876 founded the pioneering Dublin Women's Suffrage Association (DSWA), which campaigned for a greater role for women in local government and public affairs, aside from being the first women's suffrage society (after the Irish Women's Suffrage Society by Isabella Tod in 1872).

The DSWA was followed by the Irish Women's Franchise League (1908) and the Irish Catholic Women's Suffrage Association (1915), as well as the Irish Women's Suffrage Federation (IWSF), founded to unite scattered suffrage societies in Ireland. Another important association for women's rights were the Irish Women Workers' Union, which was set up on 5 September 1911 because other trade unions of the time excluded women workers.

1910–1920s: revolution and suffrage

Women participated actively in the Easter Rising of 1916, the most significant uprising in Ireland since the rebellion of 1798 and the first armed action of the Irish revolutionary period. Hanna Sheehy Skeffington, a voting rights activist, told audiences during a speaking tour in 1917 that "it is the only instance I know of in history when men fighting for freedom voluntarily included women.

Approximately 300 women took part in the subsequent Irish War of Independence, many of whom were members of the Irish republican paramilitary group Cumann na mBan. In advance of the 2016 commemoration of the Rising, several historians worked to raise awareness of women's roles. Mary McAuliffe and Liz Gillis' We Were There – 77 Women of the Easter Rising documents the stories of 77 women who were jailed for participating in the uprising. They were typically activists who had fought for social justice and equality in a variety of ways: land reform, labor organizing and women’s suffrage.

From 1918, with the rest of the United Kingdom, women in Ireland could vote at age 30 with property qualifications or in university constituencies, while men could vote at age 21 with no qualification. From separation in 1922, the Irish Free State gave equal voting rights to men and women. [“All citizens of the Irish Free State (Saorstát Eireann) without distinction of sex, who have reached the age of twenty-one years and who comply with the provisions of the prevailing electoral laws, shall have the right to vote for members of Dáil Eireann, and to take part in the Referendum and Initiative.”] Promises of equal rights from the Proclamation were embraced in the Constitution in 1922, the year Irish women achieved full voting rights.

1930s: loss of freedoms

While the first Irish Free State government supported women's rights, over the next ten years Taoiseach Éamon de Valera, who was not a supporter of women's emancipation, together with the church, enshrined Catholic and socially conservative teachings in law. De Valera’s conservative government passed legislation that eliminated women's rights to serve on juries, work after marriage, and work in industry. In 1932, the marriage bar was introduced in Ireland; it prevented any married woman from working in the public sector. Contraception in Ireland was made illegal in 1935 under the 1935 Criminal Law (Amendment) Act. Divorce was banned in Ireland in 1937.

The 1937 Constitution of Ireland guaranteed women the right to vote and to nationality and citizenship on an equal basis with men, but it also contains a provision, Article 41.2, which states:

1970s: second-wave feminist movements

Second-wave feminism in Ireland began in the 1970s, fronted by women such as Nell McCafferty, Mary Kenny, June Levine and Nuala O'Faolain. At the time, the majority of women in Ireland were housewives.

The Irish Women's Liberation Movement was an alliance of a group of Irish women who were concerned about the sexism within Ireland both socially and legally. They first began after a meeting in Dublin's Bewley's Cafe on Grafton Street in 1970. They later had their meetings in Margaret Gaj's restaurant on Baggot Street every Monday. The group was short-lived, but influential.  It was initially started with twelve women, most of whom were journalists. One of the co-founders was June Levine.

In 1971, a group of Irish feminists (including June Levine, Mary Kenny, Nell McCafferty, Máirín Johnston, and other members of the Irish Women's Liberation Movement) travelled to Belfast, Northern Ireland, on the so-called "Contraceptive Train" and returned with condoms, which were then illegal in Ireland.

In 1973, a group of feminists, chaired by Hilda Tweedy of the Irish Housewives Association, set up the Council for the Status of Women, with the goal of gaining equality for women. It was an umbrella body for women's groups. During the 1990s the council's activities included supporting projects funded by the European Social Fund, and running Women and Leadership Programmes and forums. In 1995, following a strategic review, it changed its name to the National Women's Council of Ireland.

Legal rights

Also in 1973, the marriage bar was removed in Ireland. It had been introduced in 1932, and had prevented any married woman from working in the public sector.

McGee v. The Attorney General [1974] IR 284 was a case in the Irish Supreme Court in 1974 that referenced Article 41 of the Irish Constitution. It concerned Mary McGee, whose condition was such that she was advised by her physician that if she would become pregnant again her life would be endangered. She was then instructed to use a diaphragm and spermicidal jelly that was prescribed to her. However, Section 17 of the Criminal Law Amendment Act, 1935 prohibited her from acquiring the prescription. The Supreme Court ruled by a 4 to 1 majority in favor of her, after determining that married couples have the constitutional right to make private decisions on family planning.

Prior to the Family Home Protection Act, 1976, a husband could sell or mortgage the family home, without the consent or even knowledge of his wife.

The Employment Equality Act of 1977 prohibited most gender discrimination in employment.

In 1979, the Health (Family Planning) Act, 1979 allowed the sale of contraceptives in Ireland, upon presentation of a prescription.

A setback for second-wave feminism in Ireland occurred in 1983, when the Eighth Amendment of the Constitution of Ireland was passed, which recognized "the unborn" as having a right to life equal to that of "the mother". As such, abortions could only be legally conducted in Ireland if they occurred as the result of a medical intervention performed to save the life of the pregnant woman, and later due to legislation, this risk to the woman's life also included risk from suicide. However, in 2018 the Eighth Amendment was repealed by referendum.

Ireland acceded to the Convention on the Elimination of All Forms of Discrimination against Women in 1985.

Also in 1985, the Health (Family Planning) (Amendment) Act, 1985 allowed the sale of condoms and spermicides to people over 18 in Ireland without having to present a prescription.

The Domicile and Recognition of Foreign Divorces Act, 1986, abolished the dependent domicile of the wife.

The Family Law Act 1988 abolished the legal action for restitution of conjugal rights.

Employment

The marriage bar was introduced in Ireland in 1932, and prevented any married woman from working in the public sector. It was abolished in 1973.

The Employment Equality Act, 1977 prohibited most gender discrimination in employment.

The Employment Equality Act, 1998 upholds gender equality in employment.

In Ireland, the female employment rate stretched to 60.6% in 2007 before decreasing to 57.6% in 2009 and it continued to reduce over the next three years to rest at 55.2% by 2012. However, there was a small growth within the female employment rate to 55.9% in 2014, but men worked an average of 39.2 hours a week in paid employment in 2013 in contrast to women with 31.2 hours per week.

Marriage and divorce

Divorce was banned in Ireland in 1937.

Prior to the Family Home Protection Act, 1976, a husband could sell or mortgage the family home,  without the consent or even knowledge of his wife. Prior to 1981, criminal conversation existed in Ireland, and meant a man could sue any person who had sexual relations with his wife, regardless of whether the wife consented, except that if the couple was already separated the husband could only sue if the separation was caused by the person he was suing. In Murphy v Attorney General [1982] IR 241, a married couple successfully challenged the constitutionality of ss. 192-198 of the Income Tax Act 1967, which had declared the income of a married woman who was living with her husband was counted as her husband’s income for tax purposes, rather than being counted as her own. Other important legal changes made to the family law include the Domicile and Recognition of Foreign Divorces Act, 1986, which abolished the dependent domicile of the wife; and the Family Law Act 1988, which abolished the legal action for restitution of conjugal rights. Marital rape was outlawed in 1990.

In 1996, Ireland repealed its constitutional prohibition of divorce; this was effected by the Fifteenth Amendment of the Constitution Act, 1995, which was approved by referendum on 24 November 1995 and signed into law on 17 June 1996.

Contraception and abortion

Contraception in the Republic of Ireland was made illegal in 1935 under the 1935 Criminal Law (Amendment) Act.

McGee v. The Attorney General [1974] IR 284 was a case in the Irish Supreme Court in 1974 that referenced Article 41 of the Irish Constitution. It concerned Mary McGee, whose condition was such that she was advised by her physician that if she would become pregnant again her life would be endangered. She was then instructed to use a diaphragm and spermicidal jelly that was prescribed to her. However, Section 17 of the Criminal Law Amendment Act, 1935 prohibited her from acquiring the prescription. The Supreme Court ruled by a 4 to 1 majority in favor of her, after determining that married couples have the constitutional right to make private decisions on family planning.

In 1979, the Health (Family Planning) Act, 1979 allowed the sale of contraceptives in Ireland, upon presentation of a prescription.

In 1983, the Eighth Amendment of the Constitution of Ireland was passed, which recognized "the unborn" as having a right to life equal to that of "the mother". As such, abortions could only be legally conducted in Ireland if they occurred as the result of a medical intervention performed to save the life of the pregnant woman, and later due to legislation, this risk to the woman's life also included risk from suicide. (See below events in 2012/2013). However, in 2018 the Eighth Amendment was repealed by referendum. (See below events in 2018.)

In 1985, the Health (Family Planning) (Amendment) Act, 1985 allowed the sale of condoms and spermicides to people over 18 in Ireland without having to present a prescription.

In 1992, the Thirteenth Amendment of the Constitution of Ireland was passed, specifying that the protection of the right to life of the unborn does not limit freedom of travel in and out of the state.

Also in 1992, the Fourteenth Amendment of the Constitution of Ireland was passed, specifying that the protection of the right to life of the unborn does not limit the right to distribute information about services in foreign countries.

Also in 1992, Attorney General v. X (the "X case"), [1992] IESC 1; [1992] 1 IR 1, was a landmark Irish Supreme Court case which established the right of Irish women to an abortion if a pregnant woman's life was at risk because of pregnancy, including the risk of suicide. However, Supreme Court Justice Hugh O'Flaherty, now retired, said in an interview with the Irish Times that the X Case was "peculiar to its own particular facts", since X miscarried and did not have an abortion, and this renders the case moot in Irish law. (See below events in 2012/2013).

In 1993, the Health (Family Planning) (Amendment) Act, 1992 allowed the sale of contraceptives in Ireland without prescription.

In 2012 the death of Savita Halappanavar, four days after a complete miscarriage, on 28 October at University Hospital Galway in Ireland, led to nationwide protests—which spilled over into India, Britain and many other countries—calling for a review of the abortion laws in Ireland. Partly in response to the death of Savita Halappanavar, the Irish government introduced the Protection of Life During Pregnancy Act 2013 (. Having passed both Houses of the Oireachtas in July 2013, it was signed into law on 30 July by Michael D. Higgins, the President of Ireland; it commenced on 1 January 2014. The Protection of Life During Pregnancy Act 2013  Act No.35 of 2013; previously Bill No.66 of 2013) is an Act of the Oireachtas which defined the circumstances and processes within which abortion in Ireland could be legally performed. The Act gave effect in statutory law to the terms of the Constitution of Ireland as interpreted by the Supreme Court in the 1992 judgment Attorney General v. X (the "X case"). That judgment (see above events in 1992) allowed for abortion where pregnancy endangers a woman's life, including through a risk of suicide. The provisions relating to suicide were the most contentious part of the bill. In 2013 Ireland's first legal abortion was carried out on a woman who had an unviable 18-week pregnancy and whose life was at risk.

In 2018, the Eighth Amendment of the Constitution of Ireland, which recognized "the unborn" as having a right to life equal to that of "the mother", was repealed by referendum. Feminist campaigning contributed to a positive outcome in the referendum, which resulted in a majority 'Yes' vote.

The Health (Regulation of Termination of Pregnancy) Act 2018 (Act No. 31 of 2018; previously Bill No. 105 of 2018) came into effect in 2019, and is an Act of the Oireachtas which defines the circumstances and processes within which abortion may be legally performed in Ireland. This law permits terminations to be carried out up to 12 weeks of pregnancy; or where there is a risk to the life, or of serious harm to the health, of the pregnant woman; or where there is a risk to the life, or of serious harm to the health, of the pregnant woman in an emergency; or where there is a condition present which is likely to lead to the death of the fetus either before or within 28 days of birth.

Other women's rights issues
Ireland acceded to the Convention on the Elimination of All Forms of Discrimination against Women in 1985. The Criminal Justice (Female Genital Mutilation) Act 2012 bans FGM in Ireland.

Women in Irish politics
In 1990, Mary Robinson was elected as the first female President of Ireland. The second female president, Mary McAleese, was president between 1997 and 2011.

In December 2008, Senator Ivana Bacik organised an event in Leinster House in which all the women elected to the Oireachtas over the years were honoured. Ninety-two women have been elected to Dáil Éireann, the first being Constance Markievicz in 1919. Directly prior to this, in 1918, she became the first woman elected to the House of Commons of the United Kingdom, although in line with Sinn Féin abstentionist policy she did not take her seat.

Following the 2011 Irish general election and a re-shuffle in 2014, four women were appointed cabinet ministers (the highest number of women in senior ministerial positions ever in Ireland): Joan Burton, Frances Fitzgerald, Jan O'Sullivan and Heather Humphries.

Women are a small minority of political office-holders in Ireland. The main factors are the role of traditional Catholicism in Irish political culture and the role of localism in party politics. Ann Marie O'Brien has studied the women in the Irish Department of External Affairs associated with the League of Nations and United Nations, 1923–1976. She finds that women had greater opportunities at the UN.

Mary Lou McDonald has been the Leader of the Opposition since June 2020.

Further reading
 "Coping With the Womb and the Border", by Nell McCafferty, in Sisterhood Is Global: The International Women's Movement Anthology, edited by Robin Morgan (1984)
 Sisters, by June Levine, a personal history of the Irish feminist movement (Dublin, Ward River Press, 1985)

References

Society of Ireland
Ireland, Republic of